The Journal of Bioscience and Bioengineering is a monthly peer-reviewed scientific journal. The editor-in-chief is Noriho Kamiya (Kyushu University). It is published by The Society for Biotechnology, Japan and distributed outside Japan by Elsevier. It was founded in 1923 as a Japanese-language journal and took its current title in 1999.

Abstracting and indexing
The journal is abstracted and indexed in:

According to the Journal Citation Reports, the journal has a 2017 impact factor of 2.0.15.

References

External links
 Official Journal of Bioscience and Bioengineering website
 Elsevier academic journals.com: Journal's details

Biotechnology journals
Biological engineering
Biology education
English-language journals
Monthly journals
Publications established in 1923
1923 establishments in Japan
Elsevier academic journals